Langnes is a village in Askim municipality in Viken (Østfold), Norway.

The town is most known for the historically important Battle of Langnes which occurred during the events of 1814.

Villages in Østfold
Villages in Viken (county)
Askim
Populated places on the Glomma River